Encounter with Werther is a 1949 West German historical drama film directed by Karl-Heinz Stroux and starring Horst Caspar, Heidemarie Hatheyer and Paul Klinger. It is based on the writing of the 1774 novel The Sorrows of Young Werther by Johann Wolfgang von Goethe. It was released to commemorate the writer's second hundredth birthday in August 1949.

It was shot at the Bavaria Studios in Munich and on location in Limburg, Wetzlar and Marburg an der Lahn.
The film's sets were designed by the art director Paul Markwitz.

Cast
 Horst Caspar as Werther
 Heidemarie Hatheyer as Lotte
 Paul Klinger as Albert
 Rudolf Reiff as Amtmann as Lotte's Father
 Paul Dahlke as Napoleon
 Walter Kottenkamp as Goethe
 Fritz Odemar as Graf
 Harald Mannl as Gesandter
 Christiane Felsmann as Frl. von Bassenheim
 Arthur Mentz as Bauernbursche
 Friedrich Siemers as Schreiber Heinrich
 Karl Lieffen as Bediensteter Bursche

References

Bibliography 
 Bock, Hans-Michael & Bergfelder, Tim. The Concise Cinegraph: Encyclopaedia of German Cinema. Berghahn Books, 2009.
 Gillespie, Gerald & Engel, Manfred & Dieterle, Bernard. Romantic Prose Fiction. John Benjamins Publishing, 2008.

External links

1949 films
1940s historical drama films
German historical drama films
West German films
1940s German-language films
Films set in the 1770s
Films about suicide
Films based on German novels
Films based on works by Johann Wolfgang von Goethe
Films directed by Karl-Heinz Stroux
German black-and-white films
Depictions of Napoleon on film
Cultural depictions of Johann Wolfgang von Goethe
Works based on The Sorrows of Young Werther
1949 drama films
Films shot at Bavaria Studios
1940s German films